Kent Carlsson (1962–1993) was a Swedish Social Democratic Party politician. He was a member of the Riksdag for the Stockholm municipal constituency from 1991 until his death in 1993. Carlsson was the first ever openly gay representative in the Swedish Riksdag.

References

Swedish Social Democratic Party MEPs
Members of the Riksdag
Gay politicians
Swedish LGBT politicians
1962 births
1993 deaths
LGBT legislators
20th-century Swedish LGBT people